Jared Faber (also known as J-Radical) is an American musician, composer, and producer who works primarily in television and film. He composed the theme songs for Oobi, As Told by Ginger, Emily's Reasons Why Not, and Suburgatory. He has won multiple Grammy Awards and been nominated for an Emmy Award.

Career
Faber was raised in New York City, where he attended High School of Performing Arts, and later continued his music education at Berklee College of Music, studying jazz arranging and composition. He is half of the production team Urban Legend, with partner Kool Kojak, and founded the label "Blind Lemon Music". Faber resides and is established working in Los Angeles.

Faber composed the music for the ABC show Emily's Reasons Why Not starring Heather Graham. In addition to the episodic scoring, Faber co-wrote the theme song with frequent collaborator Emily Kapnek, which was performed by Macy Gray.

Faber's forays into Latin music have led to him scoring the Fox pilot “Ernesto” starring Wilmer Valderrama, which had a decidedly Mexican style as well as collaborating with Wilmer and Rosario Dawson on the viral web series, "Voto Latino".

Faber contributed music to the film The Long Shots starring Ice Cube, featuring its song Faber co-wrote and produced, performed by Chris Pierce and Sy Smith.

Credits

Television

 * 2006 Emmy nomination for excellence in music composition-direction

Film

Video games

Discography

References

External links
 
 Jared Faber: Songwriter • Composer • Producer • Musician
  

Living people
American male composers
Animation composers
21st-century American composers
Musicians from Los Angeles
Berklee College of Music alumni
Musicians from New York City
Place of birth missing (living people)
Year of birth missing (living people)
21st-century American male musicians